Walcha can refer to
 Walcha, New South Wales, a town in northeastern New South Wales, Australia
 Walcha Shire, a local government area including the town
 Helmut Walcha (1907–1991), a German organist